A Strange Kind of Colonel (French:Un drôle de colonel) is a 1968 French comedy film directed by Jean Girault and starring Jean Lefebvre, Jean Yanne and Pascale Roberts.

Cast
 Jean Lefebvre as Cutterfeet  
 Jean Yanne as Barton  
 Pascale Roberts as Marina  
 Jean Le Poulain as Le pasteur 
 Jacques Dynam as Le policeman / Policeman  
 Henri Virlojeux as Le savant / Trilby Beach  
 Pierre Tornade as Un inspecteur  
 Florence Blot as Hortense Tito  
 Françoise Girault as Terry  
 Jean Valmont as Smith  
 Michel Galabru as Le colonel  
 Maria Pacôme as Aurélia 
 Michel Ardan as Le journaliste 
 Yves Barsacq as Le patron du pub  
 Robert Rollis as Le cireur

References

Bibliography 
 Philippe Rège. Encyclopedia of French Film Directors, Volume 1. Scarecrow Press, 2009.

External links 
 

1968 films
French comedy films
1968 comedy films
1960s French-language films
Films directed by Jean Girault
Films set in London
1960s French films